Mercedes-Benz World is a facility open to the public at the historic Brooklands motor racing circuit in Weybridge, Surrey, UK. Since then over 3 million people have visited.

Mercedes-Benz World was the first track in the UK to provide the MSA's (Motor Sports Association) newly developed coaching course leading to a professional certificate in coaching motorsport - the highest coaching qualification currently available in motorsport in the UK aimed at professional race instructors and race teams.

Activities
Mercedes-Benz World visitors can book driving time on the tracks and technical facilities to fully experience the high performance AMG range and get to know how different parts of the car's technology interact to improve handling and safety. There are courses for learning advanced skills and trying out an AMG. The driving facilities and courses include programmes adapted for every age and experience level. From somebody driving for the first time through to drivers with advanced race experience. Champions who have driven on the tracks at Mercedes-Benz World range from Lewis Hamilton and Nico Rosberg to John Surtees and Stirling Moss. As well as DTM champion Bernd Schneider, F1 champion Jenson Button and double F1 world champion Mika Häkkinen. There is a permanent team of professional advanced driving coaches on site with experience that spans every aspect of driving.

On 19 June 2011, a member of the permanent driving team at Mercedes-Benz World, Mauro Calo, broke the world drift record in the presence of adjudicators from Guinness World Records with a confirmed distance of 2308 metres in an unmodified Mercedes C63 AMG.

Since 2015, AMG Driving Academy, the German high performance division of Mercedes-Benz, has offered basic training on the tracks at Mercedes-Benz World - the only place in the world to offer this course flexibly on any day of the year and with one to one coaching as standard.

Anyone who is tall enough can drive a car at Mercedes-Benz World on parts of the original Brooklands Circuit and there are courses to allow a beginner to progress right the way through from a first drive to be able to take one of the top of the range supercars out on the tracks.

Facilities include: two high performance handling tracks, simulated ice surfaces, skid pan, high speed braking, a 4x4 course and driving areas for beginners and young drivers.

Location

The location is close to Junctions 10 and 11 of the M25 and is midway between Heathrow and Gatwick airports. Entry to the Mercedes complex is free to the public. The building is spread over three floors with over 100 cars on display including a historic 300SL Gullwing as well as the full range of current sports and performance models. There is also a cinema, restaurant, simulator studio, cafe, displays and exhibitions, event spaces and a shop. Children are welcomed and there are multiple activities available for all ages.

Arriva Guildford & West Surrey provides a contracted bus service linking Mercedes-Benz World to Weybridge railway station and Woking railway station.

The adjacent Brooklands Museum has a large collection of early motorcars, motorbikes and aeroplanes associated with Brooklands, including a Concorde, as well as a cafe, a restaurant and a kids' area. Also adjacent is London Bus Museum which displays some 35 historic London buses dating back to the 1870s.

See also
Mercedes-Benz Museum at Stuttgart, Germany

References

External links 

Brooklands Festival
Article by WhatCar.com on the launch of Mercedes-Benz World
Mercedes-Benz Servicing Specialist
 

Mercedes-Benz
Museums in Surrey
Brooklands
Automobile museums in England
Motorsport venues in England